The 1939 Spring Hill Badgers football team was an American football team that represented Spring Hill College as a member of the Dixie Conference during the 1939 college football season. In their second year under head coach Earle Smith, the team compiled a 1–7–1 record.

Schedule

References

Spring Hill
Spring Hill Badgers football seasons
Spring Hill Badgers football